Simpson County is the name of two counties in the United States:

 Simpson County, Kentucky
 Simpson County, Mississippi